The 1899 Guilford Quakers football team represented Guilford College as an independent during the 1897 college football season. They were coached by Herbert C. Petty and had a 2–1–1 record.

Schedule

References

Guilford
Guilford Quakers football seasons
College football winless seasons
Guilford Quakers football